Churston Ferrers is an area and former civil parish, in the borough of Torbay, Devon, England, situated between the south coast towns of Paignton and Brixham. Today it is administered by local government as the Churston-with-Galmpton ward of the Torbay unitary authority. It contains the coastal village of Churston, the now larger village of Galmpton and the Broadsands area.

The place-name 'Churston Ferrers' is first attested in the Domesday Book of 1086, where it appears as Cercetone, meaning 'church town or settlement'. The manor was held by Hugh de Fereris in 1303, according to Feudal Aids records, giving the second part of the name.

Churston residents tend to associate mostly with Brixham, though those in the northern part of the Churston-with-Galmpton ward often think of themselves as part of Paignton.

Churston railway station is on the Paignton and Dartmouth Steam Railway from which steam trains run daily. It is served by the frequent "Hop 12" service between Brixham and Newton Abbot operated by Stagecoach South West. In Churston Ferrers is situated the well regarded Churston Ferrers Grammar School.

The president of Churston Ferrers golf club is Ray Reardon, the Welsh six-time world snooker champion and former world number one snooker player. Churston Court, the former manor house of Churston Ferrers and today a hotel, is a Grade II* listed building situated to the immediate west of the parish church. Within the parish, off the Brixham Road, is situated Lupton House, a Palladian Country house. Both houses were seats of the Yarde-Buller family, created Baron Churston in 1858.

Cultural references
The novelist Agatha Christie was a regular guest of Lord Churston at Churston Court. In her Hercule Poirot mystery The A.B.C. Murders, the third murder takes place in Churston. Agatha Christie commissioned the installation of a stained glass window on the eastern side of the parish church in the 1950s.

References

Villages in Devon
Former civil parishes in Devon
Unparished areas in Devon
Torbay